James Alexander Harding (March 16, 1848 to May 28, 1922) was an early influential leader in the Churches of Christ.

Several schools are named after Harding: Harding University in Searcy, AR, Harding Academy (Searcy, Arkansas), Harding Academy (Memphis), and Harding School of Theology in Memphis.

Harding helped David Lipscomb, another leader in the Churches of Christ, begin Nashville Bible School which is now known as Lipscomb University in Nashville, Tennessee. Harding was the first president of the school, serving from 1891 to 1901.

External links
 James A. Harding at The Restoration Movement website

1848 births
Restoration Movement
Ministers of the Churches of Christ
Lipscomb University presidents
American members of the Churches of Christ
1922 deaths